The Georgia Tech Yellow Jackets football statistical leaders are individual statistical leaders of the Georgia Tech Yellow Jackets football program in various categories, including passing, rushing, receiving, total offense, defensive stats, and kicking. Within those areas, the lists identify single-game, single-season, and career leaders. The Yellow Jackets represent the Georgia Institute of Technology in the NCAA's Atlantic Coast Conference.

Although Georgia Tech began competing in intercollegiate football in 1892, the school's official record book considers the "modern era" to have begun in 1948. Records from before this year are often incomplete and inconsistent, and they are generally not included in these lists.

These lists are dominated by more recent players for several reasons:
 Since 1948, seasons have increased from 10 games to 11 and then 12 games in length.
 The NCAA didn't allow freshmen to play varsity football until 1972 (with the exception of the World War II years), allowing players to have four-year careers.
 Bowl games only began counting toward single-season and career statistics in 2002. The Yellow Jackets have played in 15 bowl games since then, allowing recent players an extra game to accumulate statistics.
 The Yellow Jackets have also played in the ACC Championship Game four times since its establishment in 2005, providing yet another extra game for players in those seasons.
 All of the Yellow Jackets' eight highest seasons in total offensive yards have come since 1999. Passing totals haven't been high since former head coach Paul Johnson (American football coach) arrived in 2008, as his offensive scheme was the run-heavy triple option.

These lists are updated through the end of the 2020 season. The Georgia Tech Media Guide excludes the final three games of the 2009 season from Demaryius Thomas's career and season statistics due to NCAA sanctions, but those statistics are included here.

Passing

Passing yards

Passing touchdowns

Rushing

Rushing yards

Rushing touchdowns

Receiving

Receptions

Receiving yards

Receiving touchdowns

Total offense
Total offense is the sum of passing and rushing statistics. It does not include receiving or returns.

Total offense yards

Touchdowns responsible for
"Touchdowns responsible for" is the NCAA's official term for combined passing and rushing touchdowns.

Defense

Interceptions

Tackles

Sacks

Kicking

Field goals made

Field goal percentage

References

Georgia Tech

Georgia Tech Yellow Jackets football statistical leaders